The AK-230 is a Soviet fully automatic naval twin 30 mm gun. Its primary function is anti-aircraft. It is mounted in an enclosed automatic turret and directed by radar. AK-230 is widely used, mounted on big warships as well as small craft. About 1450 guns were produced in the USSR, and about 300 were produced in China as the Type 69. It was succeeded by the more powerful AK-630 from the mid-to-late 1970s.

Development and service

Development of the weapon began during the 1950s, with the first trial weapon fitted to the Osa class of fast attack missile boats and Shershen class torpedo boats. The weapon was officially accepted into service in 1969. Its service life was relatively short, due to the fielding of the AK-630 system in the mid-1970s, which uses the same mountings and can be controlled by the same fire control systems. While its 30×210 mm round was much more powerful than the AK-630's 30×165 mm one, having the muzzle velocity of 1050 m/s (the same as with 30×173 mm GAU-8's cartridge), the moderately powered AK-630's round allowed for much higher rates of fire, especially in a Gatling-type weapon, which was considered more advantageous for the anti-aircraft system.

Description
The weapon consists of two stabilized NN-30 30 mm water-cooled four chamber revolver cannons, which are mounted inside a riveted steel turret. The gun mechanism is gas operated. The guns each weigh 155 kg and have barrels 1930 mm long, and a total length of 2670 mm. The barrels are rifled with 12 grooves. The guns each have a rate of fire of 1,000 round per minute; they are fed by independent 500-round belts of ammunition.

The rounds are electrically fired; propellent gases are used to eject the spent shells and belt links into a space between the magazine and the hull. Ballistic maximum range for the weapon is about 6.7 km, but realistic ranges for engaging air targets are quoted as between 2.5 and 4 km.

The weapon is remote-directed, typically by a fire-control system linked to either a MR-104 Rys (NATO reporting name: Drum Tilt)  or MR-103 Bars (NATO reporting name: Muff Cobb) radar systems.

Ammunition
The AK-230 fires specially developed 30x210B 30 mm ammunition that is electrically primed. Two rounds were developed: a high-explosive round with an impact fuze, and an armour-piercing round. The Chinese Type 69 fires only a locally produced version of the high-explosive round. Ammunition is also produced in Romania and Serbia.

Specifications
 Calibre: 30 mm
 Traverse: +180 to -180 degrees at 35 degree/s
 Elevation: -12 to +87 degrees at 50 degree/s
 Mounting weight: 1857 kg to 1905 kg
 Rate of fire: 2,000 rpm (system)
 Gun Weight: 343.9 lbs. (156 kg)
 Gun Length oa: 84.25 in (2.140 m)
 Bore Length:  74.69 in (1.897 m)
 Rifling Length:  71.06 in (1.805 m)
 Grooves:  12
 Chamber Volume:  13.49 in3 (0.221 dm3)
 Rate Of Fire:  over 1,000 rounds per minute cyclic

Variants
 AK-230 A type - For ships with 220 V DC power systems.
 AK-230 B type - For ships with 380 V AC power systems.
 AK-230M - Less magnetized version for minesweepers (380 V AC).
 Type 69 - Chinese upgraded version, total weight 3,600 kg. Shells are ejected outside of the turret. a faster 50 degree/second traverse.

References

General references

 Jane's Naval Weapon Systems Issue Thirty Three
 Navy Weapons.com

Naval anti-aircraft guns
Autocannons of the Soviet Union
Close-in weapon systems
30 mm artillery
Cold War artillery of the Soviet Union
Anti-aircraft guns of the Soviet Union
Military equipment introduced in the 1960s